Anna (minor planet designation: 265 Anna) is a typical Main belt asteroid.

It was discovered by Johann Palisa on 25 February 1887 in Vienna and was probably named after Anny Weiss (née Kretschmar), the daughter-in-law of astronomer Edmund Weiss.

References

External links
 The Asteroid Orbital Elements Database
 Minor Planet Discovery Circumstances
 Minor Planet Lightcurve Parameters
 
 

Background asteroids
Anna
18870225
Anna